José Gaspar Rodríguez de Francia y Velasco (6 January 1766 – 20 September 1840) was a Paraguayan lawyer and politician, and the first dictator (1814–1840) of Paraguay following its 1811 independence from the Spanish Viceroyalty of the Río de la Plata. His official title was "Supreme and Perpetual Dictator of Paraguay", but he was popularly known as El Supremo.

He is considered to be the chief ideologue and political leader of the faction that advocated for the full independence of Paraguay from the United Provinces of the Río de la Plata and from the Empire of Brazil.

Early life and education 
Francia was born in Yaguarón, in modern-day Paraguarí Department. Francia's father was an officer turned tobacco planter from São Paulo, and his mother was a Paraguayan descended from Spanish colonists. He was christened Joseph Gaspar de Franza y Velasco but later used the more popular name Rodríguez, and changed Franza to the more Spanish Francia. Although his father was simply García Rodríguez Francia (Portuguese: Garcia Rodrigues França), the dictator inserted the article de to style himself "Rodríguez de Francia y Velasco".

He studied at the monastery school of San Francisco, Asunción, originally in training for the Catholic priesthood, but never became a priest. On 13 April 1785, after four years studying, he became a doctor of theology and master of philosophy at the College of Monserrat at the National University of Córdoba in what would soon become Argentina.

Although he was dogged by suggestions that his father, a Brazilian tobacco exporter, was a mulatto, Francia was awarded a coveted chair of theology at the Seminary of San Carlos in Asunción in 1790. His radical views made his position as a teacher there untenable, and he soon gave up theology to study law. Eventually, he became a lawyer and learned five languages: Guarani, Spanish, French, Latin, and some English.

During his studies, he was influenced by the ideas of Enlightenment and then the French Revolution. Francia was disgusted by Paraguay's casta system, which was imposed by Spain, and as a lawyer, he would defend the less fortunate against the affluent. A devotee of the Enlightenment and the French Revolution, a keen reader of Voltaire, Jean-Jacques Rousseau, and the French Encyclopedists, Francia had the largest library in Asunción. His interest in astronomy, combined with his knowledge of French and other subjects considered arcane in Asunción, caused some superstitious Paraguayans to regard him as a wizard who could predict the future.

Political career 

He demonstrated an early interest in politics. He became a provincial cabildo member in 1807, fiscal officer in 1808 and attained with difficulty the position of alcalde del primer voto, or head of the Asunción cabildo, by August 1809, the highest position he could aspire to as a criollo (a native-born White). He had tried in 1798 but failed because of his humble background. Other significant members included Fulgencio Yegros; Pedro Juan Caballero; Manuel Atanasio Cabañas; and the last colonial governor, Bernardo de Velasco.

After the May Revolution in Buenos Aires, Governor Velasco convened the Congress of the province on 24 July 1810. Francia shocked the other members by saying it was irrelevant which king they had. When Paraguay's independence was declared on 15 May 1811, he was appointed secretary to the three-man ruling junta and included in the five-man governing junta by Congress meeting on 17 June 1811. On 1 August, he resigned because of the army's dominance over Congress. He retired to the countryside, where he spread rumours that the country was going to be betrayed by the incompetent government. He was one of the few men in the country with any significant education and soon became the country's real leader. Only one other Paraguayan had a doctorate: Juan Bogarin, one of the five junta members.

From his retirement in his modest chacra (farm or country estate) at Ibaray near Asunción, he told countless ordinary citizens who came to visit him that their revolution had been betrayed, the change in government had only traded a Spanish-born elite for a criollo one, and the government was incompetent and mismanaged. He returned to the junta in October if Bogarin was removed and resigned again on 15 December. He did not return again until 16 November 1812 and then only if he was in charge of foreign policy and half of the army.

Paraguayans often referred to him simply as "Dr. Francia" or Karai Guasu ("great lord" in Guarani). A few Indians believed that he had supernatural powers: when some saw him measuring the stars with his theodolite, they thought he was talking to night demons. Francia would later use it to straighten the streets of Asunción.

On 1 October 1813, Congress named Francia and Fulgencio Yegros as alternate consuls for a year. Francia was given an initial term of four months. Francia's initial term was followed by a four-month term for Yegros, which was then followed by a second four-month term for Francia. Each consul controlled half of the army. On 12 October 1813 Paraguay declared independence from the Spanish Empire.

In March 1814, Francia imposed a law that no Spaniard may intermarry with another Spaniard, and that they may only wed mestizos, Amerindians, or Africans. This was done to eliminate any socioeconomic disparities along racial lines, and also to end the predominantly criollo and peninsulare influence in Paraguay. De Francia himself was not a mestizo (although his paternal grandfather was Afro-Brazilian), but feared that racial disparities would create tensions that could threaten his absolute rule.

Dictator
On 1 October 1814, Congress named him as sole consul, with absolute powers for three years. He consolidated his power to such an extent that on 1 June 1816, another Congress voted him absolute control over the country for life. For the next 24 years, he ran the country with the aid of only three other people. According to the historian Richard Alan White, the congresses were actually very progressive for the era; all men over 23 could vote for them. From 1817, he appointed cabildo members, but in 1825, he decided to end the cabildo.

Policies 

One Latin American scholar, Antonio de la Cova, summarised Francia's rule as follows:

"...  we find a strange mixture of capacity and caprice, of far-sighted wisdom and reckless infatuation, strenuous endeavours after a high ideal and flagrant violations of the simplest principles of justice. He cut off Paraguay from the rest of the world by stopping foreign commerce, but carefully fostered its internal industries and agriculture under his personal supervision. Dr. Francia disposed to be hospitable to strangers from other lands, and kept them prisoners for years; lived a life of republican simplicity, and severely punished the slightest want of respect. As time went on he appears to have grown more arbitrary and despotic. Deeply imbued with the principles of the French Revolution, he was a stern antagonist of the church. He abolished the Inquisition, suppressed the college of theology, did away with the tithes, and inflicted endless indignities on the priests. He kept the aristocracy in subjection and discouraged marriage both by precept and example, leaving behind him several illegitimate children. For the extravagances of his later years the plea of insanity has been put forward."

Francia aimed to found a society on the principles of Rousseau's Social Contract and was also inspired by Robespierre and Napoleon. To create such a utopia, he imposed a ruthless isolation upon Paraguay, interdicting all external trade, and he fostered national industries.

Francia is often categorized as one of the caudillos of the post-colonial era, but he deviated from the authoritarian tendencies of most of his contemporaries. Instead, he attempted to reorganize Paraguay in accordance with the wishes of the lower classes and other marginalized groups. He greatly limited the power of the Church and the landed elites in favor of giving peasants a way to make a living on state-run estancias. He is criticized by some scholars for being entirely against the Church, he wanted only to diminish the institution's all-encompassing political control. He actually built new churches and supported religious festivals using state funds. Francia's government also took over services usually under church supervision, such as orphanages, hospitals, and homeless shelters, to manage them more efficiently. Francia and his policies were in fact very well received by the majority of Paraguayans, excluding the small ruling classes, and his neutrality in foreign affairs kept peace in a period of turmoil.

Francia's authoritarian regime built the foundations of a strong and dirigiste state in order to undertake the economic modernization of the country. Paraguay thus instituted rigorous protectionism at a time when most other countries were adopting the free-trade system promoted by the United Kingdom while entrusting their national bourgeoisie with the task of piloting wealth creation. This model, continued after Francia's death by his successors Carlos Antonio López and Francisco Solano López, made Paraguay one of the most modern and socially advanced countries in Latin America: the redistribution of wealth was so great that many foreign travelers reported that the country had no begging, hunger or conflict. The agrarian reform has allowed for a fairly equitable distribution of land. Asunción was one of the first capitals on the continent to inaugurate a railroad network. The country had a growing industry and a merchant fleet made up of ships built in national shipyards, had a trade surplus and was debt-free.

1820 uprising and police state 

In February 1820, Francia's political police called the Pyraguës ("hairy feet") uncovered and quickly crushed a plot by the elites and many leading independence figures to assassinate him. Juan Bogarin, the only conspirator who was still free, confessed the plot to his priest and then Francia. Almost 200 prominent Paraguayans were arrested by Francia, who executed most of them. On 9 June 1821, a letter detailing an anti-Francia conspiracy was found by two slaves and Francia's priest, who had knowledge of the plot from the confessions of a conspirator. Francia had all 300 Spaniards arrested and made them stand in the plaza while he read the letter out. They were released 18 months later only when they had paid 150,000 pesos (by comparison, the 1820 budget was 164,723 pesos). The arch-conspirators, Fulgencio Yegros and Pedro Caballero, were arrested and imprisoned for life. Caballero committed suicide on 13 July 1821, and Yegros was executed four days later.

Francia outlawed all opposition and established a secret police force. His underground prison was known as the "chamber of truth", and most of Paraguay's manufactures were made with prison labor. He abolished flogging, but his implementation of the death penalty was brutal, as he insisted all executions be carried out at a banquillo ("stool") under an orange tree outside his window. To avoid wasting bullets, most victims were bayoneted, and their families were not allowed to collect the corpses until they had been lying there all day to make sure that they were dead.

Upon his death, there were 606 prisoners in Paraguay's jails, who were mainly foreigners.

In 1821, Francia ordered the arrest and imprisonment of the famous French botanist and explorer Aimé Bonpland, who was running a private farm harvesting Yerba mate on the banks of the Paraná, which was seen to be a threat to the Paraguayan economy. Francia later granted Bonpland clemency because of his value as a physician and allowed him to live in a house if he acted as a doctor to the local garrison.

Military 
Francia believed the states of Latin America should form a confederation based on equality of nations and joint defence.
He created a small but well-equipped army, which was equipped largely with the confiscated Jesuit arsenal. The size of the army varied compared to the magnitude of the threat. In 1824, for example, the army had over 5,500 troops, but in 1834, it had only 649. Francia deliberately misled foreigners into thinking that the army was over 5,000 strong, but it rarely exceeded 2,000. He maintained a large militia of 15,000 reservists. The first Paraguayan-built warship was launched in 1815, and by the mid-1820s, a navy of 100 canoes, sloops and flatboats had been built. People had to remove their hats when meeting any soldier, and Indians who could not afford headgear wore nothing but a hat brim so that they could obey this rule. Cash could be exported only in exchange for arms and ammunition, and in 1832, 2000 muskets and sabres were imported from Brazil.

No wars were fought, but there were disputes over Candelaria with Argentina. Francia initially abandoned it in 1815, but in 1821, he built a fort on the border, another the next year, and a third in 1832. In 1838, the army again occupied Candelaria on the grounds that Francia was protecting the native Guaraní people who lived there.

Paraguayan soldiers saw action only on the outposts of the frontier, which frequently came under attack from the Guaycurú. In 1823, Francia allowed Brazilian merchants to trade in Candelaria. Francia would spend most of the state's budget on the army, but soldiers were also used for labour on public projects.

Education 
Francia abolished higher education on the grounds that it was the nation's financial priority to fund the army and that private study could be freely conducted in his library. Francia closed the country's only religious seminary in 1822, mainly because of the bishop's mental illness but also because of his purge of the power of the Church. Nevertheless, he made state education compulsory for all males in 1828, but he neither helped nor hindered private schools. However, illiteracy decreased, and the pupil-teacher ratio grew, with one teacher to 36 pupils by 1825, according to Richard Alan White. In 1836, Francia opened Paraguay's first public library, which was stocked with books confiscated from his opponents. Books were one of the few duty-free items, munitions being another.

Agriculture 
In October 1820, a plague of locusts destroyed most of the crops. Francia ordered a second harvest planted. It proved abundant and so from then on, Paraguay's farmers planted two crops a year. Throughout the decade, Francia nationalised half the land in four stages. He started by confiscating the lands of traitors and continued with clerics (1823), squatters (1825) and finally unused land (1828). The land was run directly by soldiers to make their own supplies, or it was leased to the peasants. By 1825, Paraguay was self-sufficient in sugarcane, and wheat was introduced. At the end of his life, Francia ruthlessly confined all cattle at Ytapua to stop a plague spreading from Argentina until it died out.

Refugees 
Contrary to popular belief, Paraguay was not completely isolated. Francia welcomed political refugees from various countries. José Artigas, the hero of Uruguay's independence, was given asylum in 1820, along with 200 of his men. Artigas stayed in Paraguay even after Francia's death on a pension of $30 a month and was pursued by Francisco Ramírez, who saw one of his warships also desert to Paraguay. In 1820, Francia ordered for runaway slaves to be given refuge and for refugees from Corrientes to be given canoes and land. In 1839, a whole company of Brazilian deserters was welcomed. Many ex-slaves were also sent to guard the penal colony of Tevego.

Nationalisation of Church 
In 1815, the Roman Catholic Church in Paraguay was declared independent of both Buenos Aires and Rome. Francia seized ecclesiastical properties and appointed himself head of the Paraguayan Church, reminiscent of Henry VIII declaring himself Supreme Head of the Church of England. Pope Pius VII excommunicated him for doing so, and Francia replied, "If the Holy Father himself should come to Paraguay I would make him my private chaplain."

In mid-June 1816, all nighttime processions were banned except that of Corpus Christi. In 1819, the bishop was persuaded to transfer authority to the vicar-general, and in 1820, friars were secularised. On 4 August 1820, all clergy were forced to swear allegiance to the state, and their clerical immunities were withdrawn. The four monasteries in the country were nationalised in 1824, with one later demolished and another becoming a parish church. The remaining two became an artillery park and barracks, and three convents also became barracks. Francia abolished the Inquisition, repurposed confessional boxes as sentry posts, and had the hangings made into lancers' red waistcoats.

Personal life 

Francia took several precautions against assassination. He would lock the palace doors himself, unroll the cigars that his sister made to ensure there was no poison, prepare his own yerba mate, and sleep with a pistol under his pillow. Even so, a maid tried to poison him with a piece of cake. No one could come within six paces of him or even bear a cane near him. Whenever he would go out riding, he had all bushes and trees along the route uprooted so that assassins could not hide, all shutters had to be closed, and pedestrians had to prostrate before him as he passed.

Francia lived a spartan lifestyle, and apart from some books and furniture, his only possessions were a tobacco case and a pewter confectionery box. Francia left the state treasury with at least twice as much money in it as when he took office, including 36,500 pesos of his unspent salary, the equivalent of several years' pay.

The final chapter of Rengger & Longchamps' work published in English in 1827 describes details of his personal life. This work seems to have had great impact in the English-speaking world, for many of its claims and descriptions have been accepted and used in other works. Thus, White's fictional account of Francia relies heavily on snippets of the work (e.g., one sentence in a footnote dealing with a tailor and cloth becomes an almost tragi-comic scene in El Supremo). The work is cited by historians to this day, as one of the few personal accounts, even if biased against him.

Legacy 
His reputation abroad was negative: Charles Darwin, for one, hoped he would be overthrown, though Thomas Carlyle (himself no friend to democracy) found material to admire even in the publications of Francia's detractors. Carlyle wrote in an 1843 essay that "Liberty of private judgement, unless it kept its mouth shut, was at an end in Paraguay", but considered that under the social circumstances this was of little detriment to a "Gaucho population ... not yet fit for constitutional liberty."

Francia imbued Paraguay with a tradition of autocratic rule that lasted, with only a few breaks, until 1989. He is still considered a national hero, with a museum dedicated to his memory in Yaguarón. It contains portraits of him and his daughter as well as his sweets box, candlestick and tobacco case. Paraguayan author Augusto Roa Bastos wrote an ambivalent depiction of the life of Francia, a novel entitled Yo el Supremo (I, the Supreme).

The American author Edward Lucas White published his historical work of fiction regarding Francia and Paraguay of the mid-1810s in 1916. The author reworks some history in a playful fashion. For example, he has an almost comedic section (Chapter XX, Gold Combs in Church) where the protagonist helps two friends whose family members were humiliated at the big Cathedral Sunday Mass by being removed for wearing corsets and gold combs in their hair. In the next chapter, Service By Edict, Francia forces the Catholic clerics he assembles to hold a third Sunday Mass before noon and give public prominence to the two women, who are allowed their corsets but not their gold hair combs: 

 El Supremo: A Romance of the Great Dictator of Paraguay (E. P. Dutton & Co., 1916)

References

Further reading 

 Andrade e Silva, Raul de. Ensayo sobre la Ditadura de do Paraguai, 1814–1840. (1978)
 Bealer, Lewis W. "Francia, Supreme Dictator of Paraguay" in South American Dictators During the First Century of Independence, edited by A. Curtis Wilgus (George Washington University Press, 1937; reissued by Russell & Russell Inc., 1963).

 Chávez, Julio César. El supremo dictador. 4th ed. (1964)
 Reber, Vera Blinn. "José Gaspar Rodríguez de Francia" in Encyclopedia of Latin American History and Culture, vol. 2, pp. 607–108. New York: Charles Scribner's Sons 1996.
 Rengger, J.R. & Longchamps. The Reign of Doctor J.G.R. de Francia, in Paraguay; being an account of a six years' residence in that republic, from July, 1819 to May, 1825. (Thomas Hurst, Edward Chance & Co., London 1827, translated from the French).
 Vázquez, Antonio. El Doctor Francia visto y oido por sus contemporáneos. (1975)
 Williams, John Hoyt. The Rise and Fall of the Paraguayan Republic, 1800–1870. (1979)
 White, Richard Alan. Paraguay's Autonomous Revolution, 1810–1840. (1978), .

Primary sources

External links 
 

1766 births
1840 deaths
People from Paraguarí Department
Paraguayan people of Portuguese descent
Paraguayan people of Spanish descent
Presidents of Paraguay
Paraguayan independence activists
Presidents for life
People excommunicated by the Catholic Church
19th-century Paraguayan people